Mark Grant may refer to:

Mark Grant (baseball) (born 1963), American baseball player
Mark Lyall Grant (born 1956), British diplomat